"We'll Be Together Again" is a 1945 popular song composed by Carl T. Fischer, with lyrics by Frankie Laine.

Fischer was Laine's pianist and musical director when he composed the tune, and Laine was asked to write the lyrics for it. The Pied Pipers were the first to release the song, and as well as Laine, it has since been recorded by such notable vocalists as Billie Holiday, Frank Sinatra, Louis Armstrong, Lou Rawls and Tony Bennett.

Recordings
Tony Bennett and Bill Evans – The Tony Bennett/Bill Evans Album (1975)
Ray Charles and Betty Carter – Ray Charles and Betty Carter (1961)
June Christy – A Friendly Session, Vol. 3 (2000) with the Johnny Guarnieri Quintet
Barbara Cook – All I Ask of You (1999)
Bing Crosby recorded the song in 1956 for use on his radio show and it was subsequently included in the box set The Bing Crosby CBS Radio Recordings (1954–56) issued by Mosaic Records (catalog MD7-245) in 2009. 
Scott Hamilton – The Best Things In Life (2015)
Jan Harbeck – Copenhagen Nocturne (2013)
Ella Fitzgerald – Like Someone in Love (1957)
Billie Holiday – All or Nothing at All (1959)
Lena Horne – We'll Be Together Again (1994)
Stan Kenton – On AFRS: 1944–45 (vocal: Gene Howard)
Karin Krog & Steve Kuhn – Together Again (2006)
Carmen McRae – Torchy!/Blue Moon (1999)
Pat Martino – We'll Be Together Again (1976) with Gil Goldstein
Anita O'Day – Anita Sings the Most (1957, reissued 1994)
Diane Schuur – Diane Schuur & the Count Basie Orchestra (1987)
Frank Sinatra – Songs for Swingin' Lovers! (1956)
Rod Stewart – It Had To Be You: The Great American Songbook (2002)
Seth MacFarlane – Once in a While (2019)
Dianne Reeves – A Little Moonlight (2003)
Jerry Weldon – What's New (2017)
Walter Smith III – TWIO (2018)
The song was used in the final episodes of two long-running daytime soap operas. The Tony Bennett version used in the final episode of the CBS soap opera Love of Life on February 1, 1980. The song played during the closing credits as the show's longtime director Larry Auerbach walked through the empty sets. The Lou Rawls version was used in the final episode of Search for Tomorrow, which aired on NBC on December 26, 1986. It played during the closing credits, ending as the show's star Mary Stuart, who played the serial's central character Joanne, said goodbye to the audience and thanked them for watching the show.

The version by Ray Charles and Betty Carter is used in the final ever episode of Moonlighting, aired on ABC on May 14, 1989, in which a montage of the best clips from the last five seasons is played at the very end.

References

1945 songs
Songs with lyrics by Frankie Laine
Songs written by Carl T. Fischer